Yohannes Harish (born 19 April 1993) is an Eritrean professional footballer who plays as a midfielder for USL Championship club Oakland Roots.

Career
Born in Eritrea, Harish moved to the United States and settled in Oakland, California at the age of 14. After arriving in the country, Harish joined Soccer Without Borders Oakland (SWB Oakland) where he learned English while attending Oakland International High School. In 2013, Harish began attending Holy Names University and played college soccer with the Holy Names Hawks from 2014 through 2017. He played 61 games for the Hawks across four seasons, with 4 goals. He also captained the side for his junior and senior seasons.

In 2018, Harish joined Premier Development League side San Francisco Glens, playing in seven matches through the 2018 season. He made his debut for the club on 5 May against Santa Cruz Breakers, starting in the 1–0 defeat. Harish played again with the Glens for the 2019 USL League Two season where he was eventually named captain.

Oakland Roots
In July 2019, it was reported that Harish had joined National Independent Soccer Association club Oakland Roots. He made his debut for the club on 28 September 2019 against San Diego 1904, coming on as an 84th-minute substitute in the 4–3 defeat.

Following the club's move to the USL Championship, Harish was re-signed by Oakland Roots. In the club's opening match of the season on 8 May 2021 against Phoenix Rising, Harish came on as a 63rd-minute substitute in the 3–0 defeat.

Career statistics

Personal life
Harish's mother moved to the United States when he was five years old, with Harish not being reunited with her until 11 years later when he moved to Oakland, California. Harish is also a volunteer coach with Soccer Without Borders Oakland. In matches, Harish wears the number 91 in honor of the year his birth country Eritrea earning independence in 1991.

References

External links
 Profile at Oakland Roots

1993 births
Living people
Eritrean footballers
Association football midfielders
Oakland Roots SC players
National Independent Soccer Association players
USL Championship players
Soccer players from California
Eritrean expatriate footballers
Expatriate soccer players in the United States